Josh Ritchart (born March 11, 1992) is an American professional basketball player who last played for the Rockingham Flames of the State Basketball League (SBL). After five years at UC Davis, Ritchart began his professional career in Japan, before splitting the 2016–17 season in Greece and Sweden. In 2018, he moved to Australia and joined the Flames.

High school career
Ritchart played high school basketball at Forest Lake Christian, in Auburn, California.

College career
Ritchart played college basketball at UC Davis from 2010 to 2015.

Professional career
In July 2015, Ritchart signed with Bambitious Nara of the Japanese bj league. In 49 games for Nara in 2016–17, he averaged 11.5 points and 6.9 rebounds per game.

In August 2016, Ritchart signed with Koroivos Amaliadas of the Greek Basket League. He left the team in November 2016 after appearing in five games. In January 2017, Ritchart signed with Malbas of the Swedish Basketligan. In 11 games, he averaged 12.5 points and 5.7 rebounds per game.

In January 2018, Ritchart signed with the Rockingham Flames of the State Basketball League. He averaged 26.3 points, 7.3 rebounds, 2.1 assists and 1.5 blocks in 10 games before being ruled out for the rest of the season in early May with a foot injury.

On October 31, 2018, Ritchart re-signed with the Flames for the 2019 SBL season. In June 2019, he competed in the SBL All-Star Game. Later that month, he sustained a calf injury that saw him sit out for nearly two months. In 20 games, he averaged 19.8 points, 6.8 rebounds and 1.75 assists per game.

In January 2020, Ritchart re-signed with the Flames for the 2020 season. Due to the COVID-19 pandemic, the season was cancelled.

References

External links
Josh Ritchart at ucdavisaggies.com
Josh Ritchart at sportstg.com

1992 births
Living people
American expatriate basketball people in Australia
American expatriate basketball people in Greece
American expatriate basketball people in Japan
American expatriate basketball people in Sweden
American men's basketball players
Bambitious Nara players
Basketball players from California
Koroivos B.C. players
People from Auburn, California
People from Mountain View, California
Power forwards (basketball)
Sportspeople from Greater Sacramento
Sportspeople from Santa Clara County, California
UC Davis Aggies men's basketball players